Senator Sibley may refer to:

David Sibley (politician) (born 1948), Texas State Senate
Jonas Sibley (1762–1834), Massachusetts State Senate
Mark H. Sibley (1796–1852), New York State Senate